The 3rd Canadian Infantry Brigade was a formation of the Canadian Army in both World War I and World War II.  The brigade fought on the Western Front during the First World War, and in Sicily and Italy during the Second World War.

History

World War I
First formed on 29 August 1914, the brigade was initially made up from provisional battalions that were named after their province of origin, but these titles were replaced with numerals before the brigade arrived in Britain on 14 October 1914. On arrival in Britain, it consisted of four infantry battalions, numbered 13th, 14th, 15th, and 16th. As part of the 1st Canadian Division, the brigade fought in every major Canadian engagement on the Western Front between 1915 and 1918. Its first commander was Colonel Richard Turner. From March 1916 until the end of the war, the brigade was commanded by Brigadier-General George Tuxford.

After training on Salisbury Plain in late 1914, the brigade moved as part of the 1st Canadian Division to the Western Front. During its deployment on the Western Front, the 3rd Brigade fought in the following battles and engagements on the Western Front:

1915:
Second Battle of Ypres
Battle of Gravenstafel: April 22–23 
Battle of St. Julien: April 24 – May 4 (see also Saint Julien Memorial)
Battle of Festubert: May 15–25
Second Battle of Givenchy: June 15–16

1916:
Battle of Mount Sorrel: June 2–13
Battle of the Somme
Battle of Flers-Courcelette: September 15–22
Battle of Thiepval: September 26–28
Battle of Le Transloy: October 1–18
Battle of the Ancre Heights: October 1 – November 11

1917:
Battle of Vimy Ridge: April 9–14
Battle of Arleux: April 28–29
Third Battle of the Scarpe: May 3–4 (including the capture of Fresnoy) 
Second Battle of Passchendaele: October 26 – November 10

1918:
Battle of Amiens: August 8–11
Actions round Damery: August 15–17
Battle of the Scarpe: August 26–30
Battle of Drocourt-Quéant: September 2–3
Battle of the Canal du Nord: September 27 – October 1
Battle of Cambrai: October 8–9

World War II
During World War II the brigade, again as part of the 1st Canadian Division, participated in the Allied Invasion of Sicily and then later fought in the Italian campaign.  It was demobilized for the second time at the end of the war.

Order of battle
World War I
13th Battalion (Royal Highlanders of Canada), CEF (August 1914 – November 11, 1918)
14th Battalion (Royal Montreal Regiment), CEF (August 1914 – November 11, 1918)
15th Canadian Battalion (48th Highlanders of Canada), CEF (August 1914 – November 11, 1918)
16th Canadian Battalion (The Canadian Scottish), CEF (August 1914 – November 11, 1918)

World War II
 
 1st Battalion, The Carleton and York Regiment
 1st Battalion, The West Nova Scotia Regiment
 3rd Infantry Brigade Ground Defence Platoon (Lorne Scots)

References
Citations

Bibliography

Further reading
 
 

Infantry brigades of the Canadian Army
Canadian World War I brigades
Canadian World War II brigades
Military units and formations established in 1914
Military units and formations disestablished in 1945
1914 establishments in Canada